Ó Domhnalláin is the surname of a Brehon family from Máenmaige in Uí Maine, now west County Galway.

Overview

They held the post of Cathmhaol or Battle Champion of Uí Maine, but by the early 14th century had become poets and brehons.

The family took their name from Domnallan mac Maelbrigdi, fl. c. 9th/10th century.

Their principal home was at Ballydonnellan, County Galway.

An unrelated family of the same name was located in east Ulster.

Annalistic references
The Irish annals record the following:
 Flann Óge Ó Domhnalláin, died 1342
 Mael Sechlainn Ó Domhnalláin, died 1375
 Flann Óc mac Séoan Ó Domhnalláin, died 1404
 Cormac Ó Domhnalláin, died 1436
 Ainglioch Ó Dónalláin, fl. mid-14th or mid-15th century

Later bearers of the name
 Nehemiah Donnellan, fl. c. 1560–1609.
 Sir James Donnellan, Lord Chief Justice of the Common Pleas, c. 1588-1665
 Nehemiah Donellan, 1649–1705, lawyer and Chief Baron of the Exchequer
 Pádhraic Ó Domhnalláin, fl. 1830, duelist
 Padraig Ó Domhnallain, born 1884, short-story writer
 Michael Donnellan, 1900–1964, Clann na Talmhan politician
 Pat Donnellan, born 1941, footballer
 Martin Donnellan, born 1948, Garda Síochána recipient of the Scott Medal
 Michael Donnellan (Gaelic footballer), sportsperson
Declan Donnellan, English theatre director, co-founder of Cheek by Jowl Theatre Company.

References
 Surname info, irishtimes.com

Irish families
Surnames of Irish origin
Surnames
Irish-language surnames
Irish Brehon families
Families of Irish ancestry